Friends for Life is a 1997 album by Catalan opera singer Montserrat Caballé.

Track listing
 Bohemian Rhapsody, with Bruce Dickinson (Freddie Mercury) [5:50]
 March With Me, with Vangelis (Vangelis/M. Caballé) [3:49]
 Visions of Glory, with Johnny Logan (Bernd Budden/N. Hydefeld/J. Logan/J. Fritz) [3:50]
 Ci vorrebbe il mare, with Marco Masini (Giancarlo Bigazzi) [4:38]
 Chanter pour ceux qui sont loin de chez eux, with Johnny Hallyday (Michel Berger) [4:27]
 One Life, One Soul, with Gotthard (von Rohr/Leoni/Lee) [3:58]
 A Rose in December, with Gino Vannelli (Gino Vannelli/B.C. Hamilton) [4:26]
 Sailing, with Khadja Nin (Gavin Sutherland) [4:39]
 Mi amiga Rigoberta, with Carlos Cano (Carlos Cano) [4:24]
 Had to Be, with Helmut Lotti (John Farrar/Tim Rice) [4:09]
 Friends Again, with Lisa Nilsson (Mauro Scocco) [4:19]
 Out of the Blue, with René Froger (Eric van Tijn/J. Fluitsma) [3:55]
 Love Is the Key, with Die Prinzen (S. Krumbiegel/T. Kunzel/W. Lenk) [4:41]
 Like a Dream, with Vangelis (Vangelis/M. Caballé) [3:24]
 Put the Weight on My Shoulders, with Gino Vannelli (Gino Vannelli) [4:49]
 Barcelona, with Freddie Mercury [4:28]

1997 albums